Megalinus is a genus of beetles belonging to the family Staphylinidae.

Species:
 Megalinus glabratus

References

Staphylinidae
Staphylinidae genera